The 1987 Australian Professional Championship was a professional non-ranking snooker tournament, which took place between 13 and 19 July 1987 at the Lakemba Club in Sydney, Australia.

Warren King won the tournament defeating Eddie Charlton 10–7 in the final.

Main draw

References

Australian Professional Championship
1987 in snooker
1987 in Australian sport